Brigitte Köhn ( Rohde; born 8 October 1954 in Prenzlau, Bezirk Neubrandenburg) is a retired East German sprinter who specialised in the 400 metres and later 400 metres hurdles.

She won a gold medal in 4 × 400 metres relay at the 1974 European Championships, together with teammates Waltraud Dietsch, Ellen Streidt and Angelika Handt. At the 1976 Summer Olympics in Montreal she won another gold medal in same event, with her teammates Doris Maletzki, 400 m silver medalist Christina Brehmer and 400 m bronze medalist Ellen Streidt.

After the 1976 Olympics she married, bore a child and changed event to the 400 metres hurdles. She placed fourth in her new event at the 1978 European Championships.

She competed for the club SC Neubrandenburg during her active career.

References

1954 births
Living people
Sportspeople from Prenzlau
People from Bezirk Neubrandenburg
East German female sprinters
East German female hurdlers
Olympic athletes of East Germany
Athletes (track and field) at the 1976 Summer Olympics
Olympic gold medalists for East Germany
European Athletics Championships medalists
Medalists at the 1976 Summer Olympics
Olympic gold medalists in athletics (track and field)
Recipients of the Patriotic Order of Merit in silver